Adervielle-Pouchergues is a commune in the Hautes-Pyrénées department in southwestern France.

Population

See also
Communes of the Hautes-Pyrénées department

References

Communes of Hautes-Pyrénées